The 2012–13 Cincinnati Bearcats men's basketball team represented the University of Cincinnati during the 2012–13 NCAA Division I men's basketball season. The Bearcats, led by seventh year head coach Mick Cronin, played their home games at Fifth Third Arena and were members of the Big East Conference.

Offseason

Departing players

Incoming Transfers

Recruiting class of 2013

Roster

Depth chart

Source

Schedule and results

|-
!colspan=12 style=|Exhibition

|-

|-
!colspan=12 style=|Non-conference regular season

|-ftourn
!colspan=12 style=|Big East Regular Season

|-
!colspan=12 style=|Big East tournament 

|-
!colspan=12 style=|NCAA Tournament

Awards and milestones

Big East Conference honors

All-Big East Second Team
Sean Kilpatrick

Player of the Week
Week 2: Sean Kilpatrick
Week 10: Sean Kilpatrick

Source

Rankings

References

External links

Cincinnati Bearcats men's basketball seasons
Cincinnati Bearcats
Cincinnati
Cincin
Cincin